1212 is the fifth studio album by Boston underground hip hop duo 7L & Esoteric, released on October 12, 2010 under Esoteric's own label Fly Casual Records. Released four years after their previous effort A New Dope, the album marked a return to their original boom bap sound.

Track listing

References

7L & Esoteric albums
2010 albums